Matthew Roger Green (born 12 April 1970, Shropshire) is a former British politician. He was the Liberal Democrat Member of Parliament for Ludlow from 2001 to 2005, and his party's spokesman on the Office of the Deputy Prime Minister.

Parliamentary career
He contested Wolverhampton South West in 1997 and was a councillor prior to his election to parliament.

Green was elected MP for Ludlow at the 2001 United Kingdom general election, with a majority of 1,630. He was the first Liberal to represent Ludlow since 1886. Green was appointed the party's spokesman on youth affairs in November 2001, and was spokesman on the Office of the Deputy Prime Minister between 2002 and 2003. He lost his seat to the Conservative, Philip Dunne, in the 2005 general election.

On 25 February 2006, he was selected as the Lib Dem candidate for Ludlow at the next general election but in May 2007 Green stood down as candidate owing to the rapid growth of his new business, Green Planning Solutions LLP. His brother Nathaniel Green was the Lib Dem candidate for Shrewsbury and Atcham at the 2019 general election.

Later life
His company, Green Planning Studio Ltd, acts as agents in high-profile public inquiries, which can take place after planning permission has been refused by local authorities or after an enforcement notice has been issued. Green has been dubbed the 'Gypsy King' for his advocacy for gypsies seeking the legitimisation of dwellings on green belt sites. 

Green remained involved in politics after leaving Parliament, being mentioned by the Shropshire Star as a potential Liberal Democrat candidate in the 2021 North Shropshire by-election. Though ultimately not standing in the by-election, his contribution to the successful campaign was praised by fellow ex-Liberal Democrat MP Stephen Lloyd.

Personal life 
Green was born in Shropshire, living in Ratlinghope and Bishop's Castle before moving to Much Wenlock by the time of his election. Prior to entering parliament he worked as a PR and media advisor.

References

External links
 Green Planning Solutions LLP
 Guardian Politics Ask Aristotle - Matthew Green
 They WorkForYou.com - Matthew Green
 The Public Whip - Matthew Green voting record
 BBC News - Matthew Green profile 10 February 2005
 

1970 births
Living people
Liberal Democrats (UK) MPs for English constituencies
UK MPs 2001–2005
Politicians from Shrewsbury
Members of the Parliament of the United Kingdom for constituencies in Shropshire